Claudia Walker (born 10 June 1996) is an English footballer who plays as a forward for Birmingham City. She previously played for Birmingham City, Everton, Liverpool, Stoke City, and West Ham United. Walker has represented England on the under-17, under-19 and under-23 national teams.

Club career

Youth
Walker spent her youth career with Stoke City eventually making a debut for the first team in 2013.

Liverpool FC, 2014 
Walker joined Liverpool for the 2014 FA WSL season. Walker made two appearances during the regular season. Liverpool finished in first place with a  record.

Everton FC, 2015–19 
In February 2015, Walker signed for the recently relegated Merseyside rivals, Everton of the WSL 2.

Walker would become a regular for the Blues and played forward as striker, helping Everton with the Spring Series with seven goals in nine appearances. The Blues were promoted to WSL 1 for the 2017-18 season and signed Walker to a 2-year full-time professional contract. In December 2017, Walker suffered a hamstring injury and would miss the remainder for the 2017-18 season.

Birmingham City, 2019–2021 
In January 2019, Walker went on loan to Birmingham City for the 2018–19 FA WSL season. After featuring 17 times and scoring once, she was offered a two-year contract by the club.  She made the permanent switch from Everton in June 2019, signing a two-year contract.

During the 2019–20 FA WSL season, Walker was a starting player in 10 of the 13 games she played. Birmingham City finished in 11th place with a  record. In June 2020, she was awarded the PFA Community Champion Award.

Returning to Birmingham City for the 2020–21 season, Walker scored her first goal of the season during a 5–2 loss to Manchester City. She scored the game-winning goal in a 1–0 win against Reading on 11 October. Seven days later on 18 October, she scored a 50th minute "wonder goal" in a 4–0 win against Bristol City. Her fifth goal of the season was the game winner during a 1–0 over Aston Villa on 14 November.

West Ham United 2021– 
Walker signed to West Ham 1 July 2021

International career 
Walker has represented England on the under-17, under-19 and under-23 national teams. She captained the under-19 national team during the first game of the 2014 UEFA Championship, scoring the only goal for England in the tournament. In 2017, she competed with the under-23 national team at the 2017 Nordic Tournament. Walker scored two goals in the opening match against Sweden and England would go on to win the tournament.

See also

References

Further reading
 Caudwell, Jayne (2013), Women's Football in the UK: Continuing with Gender Analyses, Taylor & Francis, 
 Grainey, Timothy (2012), Beyond Bend It Like Beckham: The Global Phenomenon of Women's Soccer, University of Nebraska Press,

External links

 Player profile at Birmingham City FC
Player profile at Everton FC

Living people
English women's footballers
Everton F.C. (women) players
FA Women's National League players
1996 births
Women's association football midfielders
Birmingham City W.F.C. players
Women's Super League players
West Ham United F.C. Women players
England women's under-23 international footballers